Darlow is an unincorporated community in Lincoln Township, Reno County, Kansas, United States.  It is located several miles west of Yoder along Red Rock Road.

History
Darlow was a station on the Atchison, Topeka and Santa Fe Railway.

Darlow had a post office from 1890 until 1935, but it was called Booth until 1900.

Education
The community is served by Haven USD 312 public school district.

References

Further reading

External links
 Reno County maps: Current, Historic, KDOT

Unincorporated communities in Reno County, Kansas
Unincorporated communities in Kansas
1890 establishments in Kansas
Populated places established in 1890